Richard Metcalfe (born 21 November 1973 in Leeds, England) is a former Scottish rugby union player. He was the world's tallest ever international rugby player. At 7 feet (213 cm), Metcalfe was about six inches taller than a typical second row forward, giving him considerable presence at the front of the line-out.

He won 13 Scotland caps between 2000 and 2001 and played for the Newcastle Falcons and Northampton Saints. At Newcastle Falcons he made 6 appearances for the Falcons the season they won the 1997-98 Premiership, and at Northampton he played in every game apart from the final for which he was a replacement (due to injury) in the victorious 2000 Heineken Cup Final as they defeated Munster. In 2003, however, his contract with the Borders/SRU was terminated and he retired after he suffered a long-term knee injury.

See also
List of tallest people

Notes

1973 births
Living people
Rugby union players from Leeds
Scottish rugby union players
Edinburgh Rugby players
Newcastle Falcons players
Northampton Saints players
Scotland international rugby union players
Rugby union locks